"Jusqu'ici tout va bien" (So far all is well) is a song by Congolese-French singer and rapper Gims, released on 6 November 2020. The song is the fifth single from the album Le Fléau. It also serves as the credits for Ici tout commence series.

Music video 
The video clip is released on 3 December 2020 and shows Gims walking around Paris. It also features "everyday heroes" such as a schoolteacher, a dentist, a food bank volunteer, a pastry chef or a nurse.

Live performances 
Gims performed the song in the program Le Grand Échiquier on 2 February 2021. He also performed it during the Symphonie pour la vie broadcast on France 3 on 10 February 2021.

Charts

Weekly charts

Year-end charts

References 

2020 songs
2020 singles
French songs
Gims songs
Songs written by Gims